Belfast Oldpark was a constituency of the Parliament of Northern Ireland.

Boundaries
Belfast Oldpark was a borough constituency comprising part of northern Belfast.  It was created in 1929 when the House of Commons (Method of Voting and Redistribution of Seats) Act (Northern Ireland) 1929 introduced first-past-the-post elections throughout Northern Ireland.

Belfast Oldpark was created by the division of Belfast North into four new constituencies.  It survived unchanged, returning one member of Parliament, until the Parliament of Northern Ireland was temporarily suspended in 1972, and then formally abolished in 1973.

Politics
In common with other seats in North Belfast, the seat had little nationalist presence.  The seat alternated between Unionist and labour movement representatives, and was often closely contested.

Members of Parliament

Election results

References

Oldpark
Northern Ireland Parliament constituencies established in 1929
Northern Ireland Parliament constituencies disestablished in 1973